Danny Murphy (22 February 1884 – 1 November 1956) was  an Australian rules footballer who played with Fitzroy in the Victorian Football League (VFL).

Fitzroy (VFL)
He made his debut, as one of the seven new players for Fitzroy — i.e., Ernie Everett, Jack Furness, Cliff Hutton, Frank Lamont, Tom Moloughney, Danny Murphy, and Eric Watson — against Melbourne on 29 April 1911.

Notes

External links 
		

1884 births
1956 deaths
Australian rules footballers from Melbourne
Fitzroy Football Club players
People from Footscray, Victoria